Glyphipterix euleucotoma is a species of sedge moths in the genus Glyphipterix. It was described by Alexey Diakonoff in 1976. It is found in Japan.

The wingspan is 9–14 mm.

References

Moths described in 1976
Glyphipterigidae
Moths of Japan